Bert Gustav Tommy Körberg (born 4 July 1948) is a Swedish singer, actor, and musician. English-speaking audiences know him best for his role as Anatoly/"The Russian" in the musical Chess. He played the role on the 1984 concept album, and on stage in the 1986 world première West End production in London, as well as several times since.

Körberg has also played the lead role in many Swedish productions of other musicals.

Career
From 1965 to 1968, Körberg was a singer in the Swedish pop group Tom & Mick & Maniacs, which went through several name changes. In August 1967, the group released the single "Somebody's Taken Maria Away", a cover of an Adam Faith song from 1965. The song went on to top the official Tio i Topp record chart for six consecutive weeks. The group had two additional hits on the chart: "Please, Please, Please" reached number five in April 1967 and "I (Who Have Nothing)" peaked at number eight in February 1968.

Following Tom & Mick & Maniacs' break-up in 1968, Körberg released his first solo album Nature Boy.

Körberg has represented Sweden in the Eurovision Song Contest on two occasions. In 1969 he finished ninth with "Judy, min vän" and in 1988 he finished twelfth with "Stad i ljus".

He has also appeared in the Swedish productions of other musicals, usually in a starring role, including The Sound of Music and Les Misérables. He was a supporting actor in the 1984 Swedish fantasy film Ronia, the Robber's Daughter, based on the novel by the same name by Swedish author Astrid Lindgren.

Körberg voiced the Beast in the Swedish dub of Beauty and the Beast, and also sang the Swedish version of the title song on the soundtrack. In the 1990s and 2000s, he took time off from other projects in order to recreate the role of Anatoly/"The Russian" in subsequent productions of Chess, including the 1994 tenth anniversary concert and the 2002 Stockholm production. For years, he collaborated with Monica and Carl-Axel Dominique in the experimental group Solar Plexus. In his own performances, he has worked extensively with Stefan Nilsson, and including songs by Jacques Brel.

Körberg is also a frequent performer with Benny Andersson's band, Benny Anderssons Orkester (BAO), singing mostly dance music and music by Andersson. In 2008 he starred in the musical Dirty Rotten Scoundrels at Cirkus in Stockholm, and in 2009 he played Professor Henry Higgins in My Fair Lady in Stockholm acting opposite Helen Sjöholm, who portrayed the role of Eliza Doolittle.

In the autumn of 2010, Körberg and his long-time friend Claes Malmberg gave a show in Gothenburg called The Big Bang Show. He was one of three judges on the Swedish reality television singing competition True Talent, which ran for one season in 2011. In 2013 he tried out for Eurovision in Melodifestivalen 2013 with the song "En Riktig Jävla Schlager" with the group Ravaillacz. They ended up in 10th place in the final.

In 1995, he was invited as one of the seventeen Jean Valjeans from around the world to perform the encore of the Les Misérables 10th Anniversary Concert at the Royal Albert Hall in London.

In 2017, he appeared as a guest performer on the album "Worlds Collide" by Swedish metalcore band Dead By April, singing on the last song, "For Every Step".

Awards and honors
In 1969, he won a Swedish Recording Industry Award Grammis in the category Best Debut Performance.

Körberg was nominated for a Laurence Olivier Award in the category Outstanding Performance by an Actor in a Musical, for his role in the 1986 world premiere of Chess.

For the 2002 Swedish production of Chess, he won a Guldmasken, the national Swedish theater award, in the category Best Actor in a Musical.

Personal life
Körberg was born in Norsjö. He is the father of actor and musician Anton Körberg, from his relationship with actress Anki Lidén. In July 2007 he married Anne-Charlotte Nilsson.

Selected discography
Swedish
1969 – Judy min vän
1970 – Tommy
1971 – Tommy Körberg
1972 – Solar Plexus (Solar Plexus; Carl-Axel Dominique, Monica Dominique, Bosse Häggström, Tommy Borgudd, Tommy Körberg)
1973 – Solar Plexus 2 (Solar Plexus; Carl-Axel Dominique, Monica Dominique, Bosse Häggström, Tommy Borgudd, Tommy Körberg)
1973 – Tommy Körberg sjunger Birger Sjöberg
1974 – Solar Plexus: Det är inte båten som gungar, det är havet som rör sig
1975 – Solar Plexus: Hellre gycklare än hycklare
1976 – Den vackraste visan
1979 – Blixtlås (Tommy Körberg, Stefan Nilsson)
1982 – Tommy Körberg och Stefan Nilsson tolkar Jaques Brel
1988 – Spotlight: Tommy Körberg
1988 – ...är...
1988 – "Stad i ljus"
1989 – Julen är här
1990 – Livslevande
1990 – Les Miserables-musical (original Swedish cast recording)
1992 – Jag skulle vilja våga tro
1994 – Ravaillac
1995 – Sound of Music-musical (original Swedish cast recording)
1997 – Aniara
1998 – Från Waterloo till Duvemåla (From Waterloo to Duvemåla)- various artists
1999 – Sånger för ensamma älskare
2000 – Hits
2000 – Stilla natt (Tommy Körberg & Oslo Gospel Choir)
2003 – Gränslös – det bästa
2003 – Chess på svenska (Chess in Swedish)-musical (original Swedish 2002 cast recording)
2006 – BAO på turné (BAO on tour) (Benny Anderssons Orkester with Helen Sjöholm & Tommy Körberg)
2007 – BAO 3 (Benny Anderssons Orkester with Helen Sjöholm & Tommy Körberg)
2007 – Rakt upp och ner (CD+DVD)
2012 – Sjung tills du stupar

English
1968 – Nature Boy
1969 – Tommy Körberg Spotlight
1968 – Don't Get Around Much Any More
1976 – Where Do We Begin (Made in Sweden; Jojje Wadenius, Tommy Körberg, Wlodek Gulgowski, Pekka Pohjola, Vesa Aaltonen)
1984 – Chess
1984 – Walk Between The Raindrops (Tommy Körberg and Tolvan Big Band)
1993 – Live in London
1994 – Chess in Concert
1996 – Evergreens
2009 – Story of a Heart (The Benny Andersson Band)
2010 – Songs for Drinkers and Other Thinkers
2018 – For Every Step (Tommy Körberg and Dead by April)

References

External links

Official website
Tommy Körberg – man i ljus, official fan club website
Official Facebook page

1948 births
Living people
People from Norsjö Municipality
Eurovision Song Contest entrants for Sweden
Eurovision Song Contest entrants of 1969
Eurovision Song Contest entrants of 1988
Melodifestivalen winners
Swedish male singers
Swedish male musical theatre actors
Swedish male voice actors
Swedish-language singers
Schlager musicians
Sonet Records artists
Melodifestivalen contestants of 2013
Melodifestivalen contestants of 1988
Melodifestivalen contestants of 1971